The domestic cat originated from Near-Eastern and Egyptian populations of the African wildcat, Felis sylvestris lybica. The family Felidae, to which all living feline species belong, arose about ten to eleven million years ago. This family is divided into eight major phylogenetic lineages. The domestic cat is a member of the Felis lineage. A number of investigations have shown that all domestic varieties of cats come from a single species of the Felis lineage, Felis catus. Variations of this lineage are found all over the world and up until recently scientists have had a hard time pinning down exactly which region gave rise to modern domestic cat breeds. Scientists believed that it was not just one incident that led to the domesticated cat but multiple, independent incidents at different places that led to these breeds. More complications arose from the fact that the wildcat population as a whole is very widespread and very similar to one another. These variations of wildcat can and will interbreed freely with one another when in close contact, further blurring the lines between taxa. Recent DNA studies, advancement in genetic technologies, and a better understanding of DNA and genetics as a whole has helped make discoveries in the evolutionary history of the domestic cat. Archaeological evidence has documented earlier dates of domestication than formerly believed.

DNA and phylogenetic evidence 
Current taxonomy tends to treat F. silvestris, F. lybica, F. catus, and F. bieti as different species. A 2007 study of feline mitochondrial DNA and microsatellites of approximately 1,000 cats from many different regions (including Africa, Azerbaijan, Kazakhstan, Mongolia, and the Middle East) showed 5 genetic lineages of the wildcat population. These lineages included: 

 Felis silvestris silvestris (Europe)
 Felis silvestris bieti (China)
 Felis silvestris ornata (Central Asia)
 Felis silvestris cafra (Southern Africa)
 Felis silvestris lybica (Middle East)

This study showed that F.s. lybica included domesticated cats and that wild cats from this group are almost indistinguishable from domesticated cats. Along with DNA analysis, phylogenetic studies were also conducted to narrow down the evolutionary history. Phylogenetic trees were generated based on mitochondrial DNA analysis. 

In each study Bayesian, maximum likelihood, and parsimony maximum likelihood trees all produced identical results. They each show that F.s. ornata, F.s. cafra, and F.s. lybica were all very closely related to a common ancestor. It also showed that this group of variations are monophyletic, meaning they share a common ancestor not shared by other groups. The trees also helped show that F.s. lybica gave rise to the domesticated cats of today. F.s. silvestris  showed a very early branching away from the other groups, but still shares a very early common ancestor with the rest of the clades.

Domesticated cats originated from near-eastern and Egyptian populations of F.s. lybica. The former gathered around human agricultural colonies themselves, while the latter (~1500 BC) seems mainly attractive in behavioral traits. They started spreading during neolithic times, but did not become widespread in the Old World until classical antiquity. A newer study from 2018 moves the earlier origin to Southwest Asia.

Traits 
A 2014 study compares many cat genomes with tiger and dog genomes. Genomic regions under selection in domestic cats include those involved in neuronal processes (fear and reward behavior) and in homologous recombination (increased recombination frequency). In addition, the KIT mutations responsible for the white-spotted phenotype were identified.

The blotched tabby cat trait (Aminopeptidase Q mutation) arose in the Middle Ages. Wild-type cats have a mackerel pattern.

Archaeological evidence 
Scientists also used archaeological and behavioral studies to help further solidify the discovery that F.s. lybica was the common ancestor to domesticated cats. Fragments of teeth and bone found at burial sites across the globe have all been connected by DNA analysis to F.s. lybica, some dating as far back as 7,000–8,000 years ago. Originally the Egyptian populations were credited with the early domestication of cats approximately 3,600 years ago but archaeological evidence also disputed the hypothesis in 2004. Archaeologists working in Cyprus found an even older burial ground, a Neolithic site that is approximately 9,500 years old, of an adult human buried with a cat. Cats are not native to this area, which means the tribe must have brought the cats with them when they established residence on the island. This finding suggests that people from the Middle Eastern region of the Old World began keeping cats thousands of years earlier than the Egyptians.

Behavioral evidence 
Behavioral analysis of F.s. silvestris (the European wildcat), which was thought to also be a common ancestor to domesticated cats, showed that there were significant differences between the two. F.s. silvestris has a tendency to be very timid and aggressive even when they are raised starting as kittens around a human population. This group was also very territorial and showed aggressive behavior within their own species as well. Hybrids between domesticated cats and silvestris showed less aggressive behavior and more docile temperament leading the scientist to believe that the behavioral difference was genetic and most likely due to a difference in species. This evidence suggests F.s. lybica is likely to be the common ancestor of all domesticated cats today.

Domestic cat breed differentiation  
Different from many other domesticated animals who were bred for food, hunting, security, or many other functional reasons, modern cat breeds originated from breeding for physical characteristics. Most of these breeds arose within the last 150 years, and, unlike other domesticated animals who have different physical traits that help them achieve different tasks, cat breeds have no differentiation in functionality—just aesthetic differences. Also different from domesticated mammals, domesticated cat breeds have very few genetic differences from their wild ancestors. Physical characteristics such as hair color and pattern. The few genes that control these traits are what differentiate the wildcat ancestors from modern domesticated cats. Domesticated cat breeds are also unique in the fact that there are only 40–50 genetically distinct breeds while other domesticated animals can have anywhere from 65 to 100 genetically distinct breeds.

Contemporary breeds 

In 1871 only five cat breeds were recognized by an association in London. Today the Cat Fanciers Association (CFA) recognizes 41 breeds  and The International Cat Association (TICA) recognizes 57 breeds. Most of these breeds are defined by phenotypic, or visible, characteristics, most of which are single gene traits found at low to moderate levels in the non-pedigree cat. These characteristics are rare and not seen in the common house cat. Unlike most pet dogs, which come from a mixture of purebreed lineages, cats started as a mixture of many wildcat variations and have been selectively bred by humans for certain traits that lead to modern breeds. This has allowed for a large increase in the number of breeds in a shorter amount of time. This is also the reason why associations that classify cat breeds use the word "pedigreed", as domestic cats do not have true purebred forms. 

DNA studies have been conducted to connect the pedigree lines to those which freely bred at random. These studies were conducted using the same techniques as mentioned above, mitochondrial DNA and microsatellites were examined to find the common ancestor. All cat breeds were found to have originated in eight different regions and then selectively bred multiple times throughout history and relocated multiple times, leading to the approximately 45 modern breeds. These eight lineages include Europe, Egypt, India, Southeast Asia, Arabian Sea, East Asia, and the Mediterranean.

See also 

 Cat § Domestication
 Cat genetics
 Domestication
 Felidae § Evolution

References 

Cats
Domesticated animal genetics
Domesticated animals
Domestication of particular species
Cat